Task management is the process of managing a task through its lifecycle. It involves planning, testing, tracking, and reporting. Task management can help either individual achieve goals, or groups of individuals collaborate and share knowledge for the accomplishment of collective goals. Tasks are also differentiated by complexity, from low to high.

Effective task management requires managing all aspects of a task, including its status, priority, time, human and financial-resources assignments, recurrence, dependency, notifications,etc. These can be lumped together broadly into the basic activities of task management.

Managing multiple individuals or team tasks may be assisted by specialized software, for example workflow or project-management software, and such software may sometimes be referred to a productivity system.

Task management may form part of project management and process management, and can serve as the foundation for efficient workflow in an organization. Project managers adhering to task-oriented management have a detailed and up-to-date project schedule, and are usually good at directing team members and moving the project forward.

Task lifecycle

The status of tasks can be described by these states:
 Ready
 Assigned
 Terminated
 Expired
 Forwarded
 Started
 Finished
 Verified
 Paused
 Failed

The state machine diagram to the right is referenced from IBM, and describes different states of a task over its lifecycle. A more up-to-date task-state machine diagram, which is applicable to the modern continuous delivery method, has also been published.

Activities supported by tasks
As a discipline, task management embraces several key activities. Various conceptual breakdowns exist, and these, at a high level, always include creative, functional, project, performance, and service activities.
 Creative activities pertain to task creation. In context, these should allow for task planning, brainstorming, creation, elaboration, clarification, organization, reduction, targeting, and preliminary prioritization.
 Functional activities pertain to personnel, sales, quality, or other management areas, for the ultimate purpose of ensuring production of final goods and services for delivery to customers. In context, these should allow for planning, reporting, tracking, prioritizing, configuring, delegating, and managing of tasks.
 Project activities pertain to planning and time and costs reporting. These can encompass multiple functional activities, but are always greater and more purposeful than the sum of their parts. In context, project activities should allow for project task breakdown, also known as work breakdown structure, task allocation, inventory across projects, and concurrent access to task databases.
 Service activities pertain to client and internal company-services provision, including customer relationship management and knowledge management. In context, these should allow for file attachment and links to tasks, document management, access rights management, inventory of client and employee records, orders and calls management, and annotating tasks.
 Performance activities pertain to tracking performance and fulfillment of assigned tasks. In context, these should allow for tracking by time, cost control, stakeholders,  priority, charts, exportable reports, status updates, deadline adjustments, and activity logging.
 Report activities pertain to the presentation of information regarding the other five activities listed, including the graphical display.

Task management software

Task management software tools abound in the marketplace. Some are free; others intended for enterprise-wide deployment purposes. Some are simple to-do lists, while others boast enterprise-wide task creation, visualization, and notification capabilities - among others. Task management is used by small to Fortune 100-sized companies. It does support simple individual projects to corporate task management activities.

Project management software, calendaring software, and workflow software also often provide task management software with advanced support for task management activities and corresponding software environment dimensions, reciprocating the myriad project and performance activities built into most good enterprise-level task management software products.

Software dimensions crisscrossing nearly all lines of task management products include task creation, task visualization, notifications, assign resources, compatibility, configurability, scalability, and reporting
 Task creation encompasses collaborative capabilities for turning ideas into actions (tasks). This includes activities involved in defining the task and encompasses the collaboration needed in the planning process.
 Task visualization encompasses presentation of tasks, most often through time and list forms. Priority visualization encompasses classification (e.g., budget, time, stakeholder) and mechanism (e.g., color code or text). Calendaring covers scheduling (e.g., availability, meetings, appointments and other potential conflicts) and notifications.
 Notifications encompass configurable settings for informing past, present and pending deadlines.
 Assigning resources encompasses the ability to delegate tasks and tools to single or multiple people.
 Compatibility encompasses the ability of a task management environment to connect to other systems, software and environments. It includes setting a structure and restrictions on communication going from the task management environment to other software, systems, and environments.
 Configurability encompasses the ability to add, remove and manage functionality and usability in task management environments.
 Scalability encompasses ability to perform a task properly when a change in the quantity of users is done to meet the specific task requirements.
 Reporting encompasses presentation of information by displaying either in tabular or graphical display.

See also
 Gantt chart
 Digital calendar
 Timeblocking
 Issue tracking system
 Milestone (project management)
 Time management
 Time-tracking software
 Work breakdown structure
 Workers' self-management

References

Management by type
Labor